Vauclair may refer to:

Bouconville-Vauclair, commune in Aisne department, Picardy, France
Vauclair castle, castle in Poitou-Charentes
Vauclair Abbey, Cistercian abbey

In people
Julien Vauclair (born 1979), Swiss ice hockey player
Sylvie Vauclair (born 1946), French astrophysicist